Hemendra Nath Chatterjee was an Indian scientist from West Bengal, who gave a dilute salt and glucose solutions both rectally and orally to a small percentage of pre-selected mildly ill cholera patients. He did not measure intake and output and presented no balance dated confirming absorption. Orally Rehydrated Saline (ORS) for diarrhea management.  His paper regarding this finding was published in Lancet of November 1953.  In that paper he states that Avomine can stop vomiting during cholera and then oral rehydration is possible. Patients also received a leaf decoction of Coleus aramaticus, a folk anti-diarrheal, along with several other medications. The formulation of the fluid replacement solution  was hypotonic sodium chloride, 25 g of glucose and 1000 ml of water. See also:Nalin, DR.https://www.mdpi.com/2414-6366/7/3/50/htm

References

External links
 

Indian medical researchers
Indian microbiologists
University of Calcutta alumni
Academic staff of the University of Calcutta
Scientists from West Bengal
Bengali scientists
Medical doctors from West Bengal